Heidi Løke (born 12 December 1982) is a Norwegian handball player for Larvik HK and the Norwegian national team.

Among her achievements as club player are national championships, a silver medal in the EHF Women's Cup Winners' Cup, and winner of the EHF Women's Champions League several times.

Career

Club career
Løke was born in Tønsberg and grew up in Sandefjord where she started to play handball at the age of ten. She played for Runar, Larvik, Gjerpen  and Aalborg DH before she again played for Larvik between 2008 and 2011. She was top scorer in the Norwegian League in the 2008/2009 and 2009/2010 seasons, and was selected Player of the Year in the league both in 2008/2009 and in 2009/2010. Her club won gold medals in both the League and the Cup in 2008/2009, and again in 2009/2010. With Larvik she reached the final in the EHF Women's Cup Winners' Cup in 2008/2009, winning the silver medal. Her club reached the semifinal in the EHF Women's Champions League in 2009/2010.

On 29 November 2010 it was rumored that she would sign with top Hungarian team Győri Audi ETO KC, but Løke refused to comment on the speculations until the forthcoming European Championship were over.

Few weeks later, on 31 December 2010, it was announced that Løke had agreed a two-years contract with Győr and would join her new club after the ongoing season was finished. As Larvik's general manager Bjørn-Gunnar Bruun Hansen revealed, they were in negotiation talks with Løke for a while, but the excellent line player got an offer they simply could not match. Shortly after her signing with Györ, Larvik's head coach Karl Erik Bøhn was dismissed from his job, due to his role in the events.

On 1 March 2012 Løke was given the IHF World Player of the Year award in recognition of her performances throughout 2011 both on club and international level.

International career
Løke made her debut in the Norwegian national team on 7 April 2006 against Hungary. She participated on the Norwegian team that won gold medals at the 2008 European Women's Handball Championship in Macedonia. She won a bronze medal with the Norwegian team at the 2009 World Women's Handball Championship in Beijing. At the 2010 European Women's Handball Championship she won a gold medal with the Norwegian team, and was selected into the All-Star team as best pivot (line player) of the tournament. The next year, at the World Championship, she repeated this success, collecting both the gold medal and earning a place in the All-Star team.

Personal
Heidi is not the only professional handballer in the Løke family. Her older brother, Frank Løke was also a former international handballer as well as a player for the Norwegian national team.  Her sister, Lise Løke is a player for Eliteserien team Storhamar HE.

She had a relationship with her former coach Leif Gautestad, with whom she had a son, Alexander, born in 2007. The couple separated in 2010.

Former partner of the now deceased handball coach Karl Erik Bøhn.

Gave birth to her second son, Oscar on 30 June 2017, with new boyfriend Bjørn Vestrum Olsson. She was back in training six days later, and attended her first handball training for her new club Storhamar HE only 25 days after she gave birth.

Her third son, Casper was born on 23 April 2022 from partner Stian Bodin Sundal.

Achievements
World Championship:
Winner: 2011, 2015
Silver Medalist: 2017
Bronze Medalist: 2009
European Championship:
Winner: 2008, 2010, 2014, 2020
Silver Medalist: 2012
Summer Olympics:
Winner: 2012
Bronze Medalist: 2016
EHF Champions League:
Winner: 2010/2011, 2012/2013, 2013/2014, 2016/2017, 2020/2021
Finalist: 2011/2012, 2015/2016
Semifinalist: 2009/2010
EHF Cup Winners' Cup:
Finalist: 2009
Semifinalist: 2006
Norwegian Championship:
Winner: 2008/2009 (Larvik), 2009/2010 (Larvik), 2010/2011 (Larvik), 2019/2020 (Vipers), 2020/2021 (Vipers)
Silver medalist: 2018/2019 (Storhamar)
Norwegian Cup:
Winner: 2008, 2009, 2010, 2019, 2020
Finalist: 2018
Nemzeti Bajnokság I:
Winner: 2012, 2013, 2014, 2016, 2017
Magyar Kupa:
Winner: 2012, 2013, 2014, 2015, 2016

Awards and recognition
 Top Scorer of Eliteserien: 2008/2009 (216 goals), 2009/2010 (204 goals), 2010/2011 (221 goals)
 Best Player of Eliteserien: 2008/2009, 2009/2010, 2010/2011
 All Star Line Player of Eliteserien: 2008/2009, 2009/2010, 2010/2011, 2019/2020, 2020/2021
 EHF Champions League Top Scorer: 2011 (99 goals)
 All-Star Line Player of the European Championship: 2010, 2012, 2014
 All-Star Line Player of the World Championship: 2011, 2015
 IHF World Player of the Year: 2011 (also nominated for 2012)
 All Star Line Player of the Summer Olympics: 2012, 2016
 All-Star Team Best Line Player of the EHF Champions League: 2014/2015; 2015/2016
 Foreign Handballer of the Year in Hungary: 2015
 All-Star Pivot of the Møbelringen Cup: 2018

References

External links

Heidi Løke on europamester.dk 

1982 births
Living people
Sportspeople from Tønsberg
Norwegian female handball players
Expatriate handball players
Norwegian expatriate sportspeople in Denmark
Norwegian expatriate sportspeople in Hungary
Győri Audi ETO KC players
Handball players at the 2012 Summer Olympics
Handball players at the 2016 Summer Olympics
Olympic handball players of Norway
Olympic medalists in handball
Olympic gold medalists for Norway
Olympic bronze medalists for Norway
Medalists at the 2012 Summer Olympics
Medalists at the 2016 Summer Olympics